Na Si-yun was a South Korean weightlifter. He competed in the men's lightweight event at the 1948 Summer Olympics.

References

External links
 

Year of birth missing
Possibly living people
South Korean male weightlifters
Olympic weightlifters of South Korea
Weightlifters at the 1948 Summer Olympics
Place of birth missing
Asian Games medalists in weightlifting
Weightlifters at the 1954 Asian Games
Asian Games silver medalists for South Korea
Medalists at the 1954 Asian Games
20th-century South Korean people